Boneau may be:
 Boneau, Montana, USA
 Chris Boneau, an American theatrical press agent

See also 
 Boneau/Bryan-Brown, an American theatrical press agency